Podolobium procumbens, commonly known as trailing shaggy-pea, trailing podolobium or trailing oxylobium,  is a flowering plant in the family Fabaceae and is endemic to south-eastern Australia. It is a trailing small shrub with oval-shaped leaves and orange pea-like flowers.

Description

Taxonomy and naming
Trailing shaggy-pea was first formally described in 1855 by botanist Ferdinand von Mueller who gave it the name Oxylobium procumbens in Definitions of rare or hitherto undescribed Australian plants. In 1995 Michael Crisp and Peter Henry Weston changed the name to Podolobium procumbens and the change was published in Advances in Legume Systematics. The specific epithet (procumbens) means "procumbent".

Ferdinand von Mueller had previously published the name Podolobium procumbens in a report to the Victorian Government in 1853, but the name was not validly published because it was a nomen nudum, that is, there was no Latin description.

Distribution and habitat
Trailing shaggy-pea occurs in  sclerophyll forests and woodland in Victoria and south-eastern New South Wales.

References

Fabales of Australia
Flora of New South Wales
Flora of Victoria (Australia)
procumbens
Plants described in 1855
Taxa named by Ferdinand von Mueller